Obania tulliana is a butterfly in the family Lycaenidae. It is found in the Democratic Republic of the Congo (Uele, North Kivu and Sankuru).

References

External links
Die Gross-Schmetterlinge der Erde 13: Die Afrikanischen Tagfalter. Plate XIII 65 b

Butterflies described in 1901
Poritiinae
Endemic fauna of the Democratic Republic of the Congo